Kyenjojo General Hospital, also Kyenjojo District Hospital, or Kyenjojo Government Hospital, is a hospital in the Western Region of Uganda.

Location

The coordinates of Kyenjojo Hospital are 0°37'01.0"N, 30°38'15.0"E (Latitude:0.616942; Longitude:30.637493).

Overview
Prior to attaining hospital status, Kyenjojo General Hospital was Kyenjojo Health Centre IV, the largest government health care facility in the district. The hospital attends to the general population but sees a fair number of obstetric complications, and a significant number of road accident victims. The hospital is on the list of general hospitals earmarked for renovation and expansion.

See also
List of hospitals in Uganda

References

External links 
 Website of Uganda Ministry of Health
 Hospitals get facelift, but far from better service delivery

Kyenjojo
Kyenjojo District
Toro sub-region
Western Region, Uganda
Hospitals established in 2011
2011 establishments in Uganda